The 2013 FINA Diving World Series is the 2013 edition of  FINA Diving World Series. The divers who participate are the current world and olympic champions and runners-up, the top 8 divers in the world rankings and along with some wild cards from either the host nation or from certain countries which had previously qualified athletes for the World Series. This World Series was made up by six legs hosted in different cities: 1st leg Beijing, China, 2nd leg Sheffield, United Kingdom, 3rd leg Dubai, United Arab Emirates , 4th leg Moscow, Russia, and 5th and 6th legs Guadalajara, Mexico

Overall medal tally

Beijing leg

Medal table

Medal summary

Men

Women

Dubai leg

Medal table

Medal summary

Men

Women

Edinburgh leg

Medal table

Medal summary

Men

Women

Moscow leg

Medal table

Medal summary

Men

Women

Guadalajara No. 1 leg

Medal table

Medal summary

Men

Women

Guadalajara No. 2 leg

Medal table

Medal summary

Men

Women

References

External links
 2013 FINA World Diving Series official mini-site

2013 in diving
FINA Diving World Series